Pat, Paddy or Patrick McMahon or MacMahon or Mac Mahon may refer to:

Pat McMahon (athlete) (born 1942), Irish long-distance runner
Pat McMahon (baseball) (born 1953), former head baseball coach of the Mississippi State Bulldogs and the Florida Gators
Pat McMahon (footballer, born 1908) (1908–1992), Scottish football goalkeeper
Pat McMahon (footballer, born 1945), Scottish football player
Pat McMahon (soccer, born 1986), American soccer player
Pat McMahon (rugby league) (born 1927), Australian professional rugby league footballer
Paddy McMahon (equestrian) (1933–2021), show jumper
Paddy McMahon (hurler), Irish hurler
Patrick MacMahon (bishop) (died c. 1572 or c. 1575), 16th-century bishop of Ardagh in Ireland
Patrick McMahon, film editor of Teeny Little Super Guy
Patrick McMahon (MP) (1813–1875), British Member of Parliament for New Ross and County Wexford
Pat McMahon (actor) (born 1933), American television actor and broadcaster

See also
Patrice de MacMahon, Duke of Magenta (1808–1893), French general and politician